Artemis, also called Prasonisi ("leek island"), is a small uninhabited islet close to the southern coast of Crete in the Libyan Sea. It is located south-east of Elafonisi. Administratively, it is within the municipality of Innachori, in Chania regional unit.

See also
List of islands of Greece

Landforms of Chania (regional unit)
Uninhabited islands of Crete
Islands of Greece